Robert Aldridge, later Robert Aldridge-Busby ( 1768 – July 1837) was an Irish politician.  He sat in the Irish House of Commons as a Member of Parliament (MP) for Carysfort from 1799 to 1800. In 1820, he changed his surname to Aldridge-Busby.

References 

Year of birth uncertain
1760s births
1837 deaths
Members of the Parliament of Ireland (pre-1801) for County Wicklow constituencies
Irish MPs 1798–1800